Carmentina chrysosema is a species of sedge moths in the genus Carmentina. It was described by Edward Meyrick in 1933. It is found on the Solomon Islands.

References

Moths described in 1933
Glyphipterigidae